Athletes from the Algeria competed at the 1992 Summer Paralympics in Barcelona, Spain. It's the first participation of Algeria in the games.

Competitors
Algeria had an 8-member large delegation in Barcelona, all of whom were men.  They would not send women for the first time until the 2000 Games. The team included Abdelkrim Yousei.

Results by event

Athletics
Abdelkrim participated in heat 4 of the Men's 5000 m TW3-4, finishing last with a time of 14:02.06.  He had a DNF in the Men's Marathon TW3-4.
Men

Goalball

Men

See also
Algeria at the Paralympics
Algeria at the 1992 Summer Olympics

References 

Nations at the 1992 Summer Paralympics
1992
Summer Paralympics